The Burning Bridge is the second book of the Ranger's Apprentice series, written by Australian author John Flanagan. It was released in Australia on 5 May 2005.

Plot summary
In the prologue, Halt (a legendary Ranger) and Will (the protagonist and Halt's apprentice), capture Dirk Reacher, one of Morgarath's former henchmen. They search Reacher and find Mogarath’s battle plans to invade Araluen. Halt and Will think over it, but decide it is genuine.

Meanwhile, on a special mission for the Ranger Corps, Will, his friend Horace (a Battleschool apprentice), and the Ranger Gilan (one of Halt's former apprentices) travel to Celtica, a neighbouring country southwest of Araluen, where they discover that all the people in the villages have mysteriously vanished. Will and Horace wonder if all the villagers have been slain or captured, but Gilan believes that the evil Lord Morgarath devised a plan to cross the mountain pass faster. If that was true, and the King wasn't warned, the country would be destroyed. Gilan rides to warn King Duncan, the King of Araluen, and Will and Horace begin to follow a straggling Wargal force. On their way, they come across an abandoned girl named Evanlyn, who claims to be a maid to Lady Ariana Wulton of the Araluen court, but is actually Princess Cassandra, King Duncan's daughter, in disguise. When the three of them follow the dimwitted Wargals they discover that a gargantuan bridge is in the process of being built across the impassable Fissure for their war party to cross. They also discover that the King's army will be trapped on the Plains of Uthal, because the plans that Halt and Will captured in the prologue of the book were merely a ruse to distract them. Will burns the bridge with Evanlyn's help. Evanlyn tries to warn Will about a rock thrown by a Skandian but is too late, giving a chance for a Skandian to grab them. Will and Evanlyn are taken captive by the group of Skandians ruled by Jarl Erak, but Horace is able to escape their grasp. After, he tells the King and his aides about what is going to happen, the army starts to get prepared for the army that is supposed to attack them from behind, Halt is sent to take care of them with a force of cavalry and archer units (a unit consist of an archer and a pikeman). In the middle of the battle, Morgarath calls a truce and challenges Halt to a duel, but King Duncan forbids it to happen. Then, unexpectedly, Horace challenges Morgarath to single combat. About to be defeated by Morgarath, Horace then, in a attempt to win the duel, throws himself into the path of Mogarath’s battle horse, to throw it off balance. He is successful, but only manages to wind Morgarath. Morgarath is confident that he is going to win by a last powerful stroke of his broadsword, but Horace blocks it with the double-knife defence that Gilan taught Will in Celtics and stabs Morgarath in the heart to win the battle. The Wargals become harmless as soon as Morgarath dies and the mind domination is broken. Immediately Halt goes looking for Will and Cassandra but he is too late. The Skandians sail for Skandia to sell Will and Princess Cassandra as slaves.

External links 
 The Burning Bridge at Random House Australia
 The Burning Bridge at Penguin Group (USA)
 The Burning Bridge at Random House UK
 The Burning Bridge at Random House NZ

Ranger's Apprentice books
2005 Australian novels